The 1965 BYU Cougars football team was an American football team that represented Brigham Young University (BYU) as a member of the Western Athletic Conference (WAC) during the 1965 NCAA University Division football season. In their second season under head coach Tommy Hudspeth, the Cougars compiled an overall record of 6–4 with a mark of 4–1 in conference play, won the WAC title, and outscored opponents 229 to 178. The conference championship was the first program history.

The Cougars' statistical leaders included Virgil Carter with 1,789 passing yards, John Ogden with 700 rushing yards, and Phil Odle with 657 receiving yards and 66 points scored.

The morning of the season finale at New Mexico, a chartered DC-3 with thirteen aboard crashed in a snowstorm near Camp Williams, between Salt Lake City and Provo, Utah. It was bound for Provo to pick up more passengers for the afternoon game in Albuquerque; there were no survivors.

Schedule

Roster

References

BYU
BYU Cougars football seasons
Western Athletic Conference football champion seasons
BYU Cougars football